Akademik Lomonosov is a non-self-propelled power barge that operates as the first Russian floating nuclear power station. The ship was named after academician Mikhail Lomonosov. It is docked in the Pevek harbour, providing heat to the town and supplying electricity to the regional Chaun-Bilibino power system. It is the world’s northernmost nuclear power plant.

History
Construction started at the Sevmash Submarine-Building Plant in Severodvinsk. The keel of Akademik Lomonosov was laid on 15 April 2007 and completion was initially planned in May 2010. The celebrations were attended by the first deputy prime minister of Russia, Sergei Ivanov, and by the head of Rosatom, Sergei Kiriyenko.

In August 2008, the Russian government approved the transfer of work from Sevmash to the Baltic Shipyard (Baltiysky Zavod) in Saint Petersburg. A second keel-laying was done at the new shipyard in May 2009. Akademik Lomonosov was launched on 30 June 2010. The first reactor, a KLT-40S design by OKBM Afrikantov, was delivered in May 2009 and the second one in August 2009 by AtomEnergoProekt (NN-AEP); they were installed in October 2013.

Originally, Akademik Lomonosov was supposed to supply power to the Sevmash shipyard itself and the town Severodvinsk, located in Arkhangelsk Oblast in Northwest Russia, however, it was decided later to deploy the power barge at Pevek, in the Chukotka region in Russia's Far East.
It was expected to be delivered in 2019, and to replace the nearby Bilibino Nuclear Power Plant which was at the end of its service life.

On 28 April 2018, it left St. Petersburg under tow for Murmansk, where it received nuclear fuel for the first time. On 17 May 2018, it arrived at Murmansk. The Akademik Lomonosov power station was officially handed over to the Russian state nuclear power company on 4 July 2019. The 5000 km (3100 mi) towing operation through the Arctic Ocean by icebreaker Dikson began on 23 August 2019. On 9 September 2019, it arrived at its permanent location in the Chukotka district, the far eastern end of the Far East region. It started operation on 19 December 2019. On 22 May 2020 the plant has been fully commissioned, by that date it had delivered 47.3 GWh zero-emissions electric energy, covering 20% of demand in the region. On 30 June 2020 it started to supply thermal power to Pevek.

Initially, estimated costs were 6 billion rubles ($232 million), whereas later calculations in 2015 summed up to 37 billion rubles ($700 million), including infrastructure reinforcements in Pevek.

Description
It has a displacement of 21,500 tonnes and a crew of 69 people. According to The New York Times, it will have a crew of about 300 people.
For the power generation, it has two KLT-40S reactors derived from icebreaker propulsion reactors, which together provide thermal reactor power of 300 MW which is transformed in two turbo-generating sets into 70 MW of electricity (gross). The reactors use low-enriched uranium (LEU) fuel, with 14.1% average enrichment, with a fuel cycle of 3 years. The Akademik Lomonosov can work as cogeneration plant, as waste heat is collected and she can provide up to 60 MW thermal power via clamped pipelines for heating purposes, peak heat delivery is up to 170 MW while reducing the electric output to 30 MW (cf. extraction steam turbine). Another joint product is up to 240,000 m3/d freshwater made from seawater.

Reactors were designed by OKBM Afrikantov and assembled by Nizhniy Novgorod Research and Development Institute Atomenergoproekt (both part of Atomenergoprom). The reactor vessels were produced by Izhorskiye Zavody. The turbo-generators were supplied by Kaluga Turbine Plant.

Criticism 
Akademik Lomonosov has come under criticism from environmental groups such as Greenpeace and the Bellona Foundation. The Bellona Foundation have written a report criticizing the floating nuclear power plant. Greenpeace criticized the project as one that may cause harm to a "fragile environment which is already under enormous pressure from climate change", referring to the project using terms such as "nuclear Titanic" and "Chernobyl on Ice".

Rosatom explained in response that the PWR reactor technology used in the power plant has nothing in common with the old RBMK reactor design in Chernobyl and is designed to shut down automatically without external power and human intervention in case of emergency. The design incorporates all the state-of-the-art safeguards as documented in IAEA INSAG-3 recommendation and Russian civilian reactors had not a single accident leading to a radioactive leak in 34 years. Akademik Lomonosov is not the first marine vessel with nuclear reactors, with nuclear marine propulsion used by many military and civilian vessels since the 1950s.

References

External links
 - on Power Technology official site
] - on Rosatom Official YouTube Channel

Nuclear power stations in Russia
Service vessels of Russia
Floating nuclear power stations
2018 ships
Nuclear power stations using pressurized water reactors